Hamed Rezakhani (born 1 January 1979) is an Iranian swimmer. He competed in the men's 1500 metre freestyle event at the 1996 Summer Olympics.

References

1979 births
Living people
Iranian male swimmers
Olympic swimmers of Iran
Swimmers at the 1996 Summer Olympics
Place of birth missing (living people)
Swimmers at the 1998 Asian Games
Asian Games competitors for Iran